House of Horror is a 1929 American comedy mystery film directed by Benjamin Christensen. The film stars Louise Fazenda and Chester Conklin and was released in both a silent and sound version which featured a Vitaphone soundtrack with talking sequences, music and sound effects. Both the silent and sound version of House of Horror is now presumed lost.

Cast

Production
The House of Horrors was released with both silent and sound versions of the film. The sound version of the film contained a brief talking sequence at the beginning of the feature but was otherwise just with sound effects and a music score from a Vitaphone disc.

Release
The House of Horrors was distributed by First National Pictures on April 28, 1929. The film was Christensen's final Hollywood production as after completing the film he went to Denmark to handle some business ventures . Christensen had plans to make an independent production and return to the United States to follow-up with an American film but he returned to Denmark again 1934.

As of 2018 both the sound and silent version of the film are considered lost films.

Reception
From contemporary reviews, Photoplay called the film a "cheap claptrap mystery movie which is saved by the comedy of Chester Conklin and Louise Fazenda" A review in Variety declared it "one of the weakest and most boring afterbirths of pseudo mystery-comedy grinds out of Hollywood. The thing actually rants and rambles, with audience of any mental caliber at sea until the last reel when the title writer makes a supreme effort to account with cart before horse angle." Film Daily declared the film "just a dud that develops nothing in a flat mystery story with a lot of phony situations" declaring its gags as "ancient". Harrison's Reports called the film "a comedy-mystery melodrama, that does not hold the interest too much because the spectator suspects the ending almost from the beginning and is bored by the useless chasing in and out of rooms [...] The familiar hokum of trap doors, mysterious falling objects and door slamming take place"

References

Sources

External links
 

1929 films
1929 lost films
1929 mystery films
American mystery films
American silent feature films
American black-and-white films
1920s English-language films
Films directed by Benjamin Christensen
First National Pictures films
Transitional sound films
Lost American films
Lost mystery films
1920s American films
Silent mystery films